The 2006 New Zealand Warriors season was the 12th in the club's history. The club competed in Australasia's National Rugby League. The coach of the team was Ivan Cleary while Steve Price was the club captain.

Milestones
 25 March - Round 3: Awen Guttenbeil played in his 150th match for the club.
 25 June - Round 16: The Warriors defeated the South Sydney Rabbitohs 66–0 at Telstra Stadium. This result stands as the Warriors largest victory to date.
9 July - Round 18: Jerome Ropati played in his 50th match for the club.
9 July - Round 18: Louis Anderson played in his 50th match for the club.
 12 August - Round 23: Brent Webb played in his 100th match for the club.

Salary cap breach
Before the season started the Warriors were investigated by the National Rugby League over alleged salary cap breaches committed by the team's previous administrators. The club admitted to inflating its salary cap to the tune of nearly $1 million during the 2005 season. As punishment, the National Rugby League fined the Warriors club $430,000 and stripped the team of four competition points prior to the beginning of the season. It was the first time in 99 years of rugby league in Australia that a team has started a season on less than zero premiership points.

The Warriors appealed the decision by the NRL to strip the four competition points but accepted the financial penalty. Prior to the beginning of the season, the National Rugby League confirmed that the points penalty would stand. The penalty would prove the decisive factor in the Warriors missing the finals for the third year in succession.

Jersey & Sponsors

Fixtures

The Warriors used Ericsson Stadium as their home ground in 2006, their only home ground since they entered the competition in 1995. On 12 July, the stadium reverted to its original name: Mt Smart Stadium.

Pre-Season

Regular season

Ladder

Squad

Twenty five players were used by the Warriors in 2006, including several players who made their first grade debuts.

Staff
 Chief Executive Officer: Wayne Scurrah

Coaching Staff
 Head coach: Ivan Cleary
 Assistant coach: John Ackland
Development coach: Tony Iro
Trainer: Craig Walker

Transfers

Gains

Losses

Mid-Season Losses

Awards
 14 September – Steve Price wins the club's premier accolade as the Lion Red Player of the Year. Grant Rovelli wins the Vodafone Young Player of the Year, Micheal Luck the Puma Clubman of the Year and Brent Webb the Vodafone One Tribe Supporters' Player of the Year.

Other teams
Players not required by the Warriors were released to play in the 2006 Bartercard Cup. These included Misi Taulapapa for the Mount Albert Lions and Cooper Vuna for the Tamaki Titans. Sam Rapira and Lance Hohaia both made appearances for the Waicoa Bay Stallions while Richard Villasanti played for the Canterbury Bulls.

References

External links
 Warriors official site
 2006 Warriors Season at rugbyleagueproject.org

New Zealand Warriors seasons
New Zealand Warriors season
War